Yasmina Siadatan (born 1981 in Hull, England) is a British businesswoman of British and Iranian descent. She was the winner of the fifth series of the British television show The Apprentice. As the winner, she was offered a job working for businessman Sir Alan Sugar (now Lord Sugar), who presents the show.

Education
Siadatan studied at Kendrick School, Reading.
Yasmina also attended LSE and studied economic history.

Career prior to The Apprentice

After travelling in Provence in 2007 with the help of her brother she set up a restaurant named Myalacarte in Reading, Caversham, which subsequently closed down and a pizza restaurant is now on the site.

The Apprentice
Yasmina entered The Apprentice in 2009 as one of sixteen contestants. She reached the final where she competed against Kate Walsh and was eventually hired as Sir Alan Sugar's apprentice, taking a £100,000 a year job with his company, Amscreen Health Care, where 2008's winner, Lee McQueen worked at the time.

References

External links
 BBC Yasmina interview

The Apprentice (British TV series) candidates
The Apprentice (franchise) winners
British people of Iranian descent
Businesspeople from Kingston upon Hull
Living people
1981 births
People educated at Kendrick School